Lycée Paul Bert may refer to:
Lycée Paul Bert in Paris
Lycée Paul Bert in Bayonne
Lycée Paul Bert in Maisons-Alfort (Paris area)
Lycée Jacques Prévert in Boulogne-Billancourt, formerly Lycée Paul Bert